Parlami d'amore (English: Speak to me of love) is a 2008 Italo-Spanish film directed by Silvio Muccino. The film is based on Muccino's novel of the same name that he co-wrote with Carla Vangelista. The film was nominated for 8 David di Donatello awards. The film was released in Italy on 14 February 2008.

Plot
Distracted by taking her antidepressants, Nicole (Sanchez-Gijon) causes an accident with Sasha (Muccino), who's just left a communal home for the families of drug addicts. Despite the circumstances of their meeting, the pair become friends and Sasha seeks Nicole's help in pursuing his love interest, Bendetta (Crescentini). Despite her beauty, Bendetta is the spoiled daughter of Sasha's patron, Riccardo (Colangeli)
She appears to spend much of her time abusing alcohol, surrounded by like-minded rich youth that also delve into cocaine.

Sasha is then approached by a former acquaintance, former addict, Fabrizio (Mazzotta) who is looking for money to participate in an upcoming poker game. Sasha decides to get involved in the game himself. He scores big and adapts to the gambler's lifestyle, gaining respect from Bendetta's spoiled friends. Meanwhile Nicole's life continues to unravel, racked by feelings of guilt over the death of her former lover ten years earlier. She even visit's the forgiving mother (Chaplin) of her former lover. She also looks for escape from her passionless marriage and looks towards Sasha.

Cast
Silvio Muccino as Sasha
Aitana Sánchez-Gijón as Nicole
Carolina Crescentini as Benedetta
Geraldine Chaplin as Amelie
Giorgio Colangeli as Riccardo
Niccolò Senni as Giacomo
Flavio Parenti as Tancredi
Max Mazzotta as Fabrizio
Andrea Renzi as Lorenzo
Giorgio Sgobbi as Architetto

Reception
The film debuted at no. 1 on the Italian box office. It had grossed over $11. 5 million by the end of March 2008.

Awards
David di Donatello for David of the Youth
Nastro d'Argento for Best Cinematography

Nominations
David di Donatello for Best Cinematography
David di Donatello for Best Costumes
David di Donatello for Best Score
David di Donatello for Best New Director
David di Donatello for Best Supporting Actress
Nastro d'Argento for Best New Director
Nastro d'Argento for Best Producer
Nastro d'Argento Best Production Design

References

External links
 

2008 films
Italian romantic comedy films
2000s Italian-language films
Films shot in Rome
Films based on Italian novels